Francesco Mercoli (1894 – 1959) was an Italian weightlifter. He competed in the men's heavyweight event at the 1928 Summer Olympics.

References

1894 births
1959 deaths
Italian male weightlifters
Olympic weightlifters of Italy
Weightlifters at the 1928 Summer Olympics
Sportspeople from Milan
20th-century Italian people